The Ṣǝḥuf ʾǝmni inscription ('inscribed stone') is an undeciphered stone inscription located in Qoḥayn in Eritrea. It is listed under no. 183 in the Recueil des inscriptions de l'Éthiopie des périodes pré-axoumites et axoumites, where a transcription of the text is provided.

The Ṣǝḥuf ʾǝmni inscription is written in the South Arabian script. However, its language has not yet been identified, and the contents of the inscription remain unknown. The inscription has not been dated, but it has been suggested that the paleography is reminiscent of inscriptions by Ezana, who reigned in the 4th century CE.

Documentation
The site of the inscription, which is known as "Ṣǝḥuf ʾǝmni" on account of the presence of the inscribed stone, was first described by members of the topographical mission of the Istituto Geografico in Florence in 1897. On 8 June 1898, a transcription of the inscription was carried out by Alonso Maria Tancredi. One year later, on 4 June 1898, Carlo Conti Rossini produced another transcription. In 1946, a photography of the inscription was sent to Conti Rossini and in the following year, he published this in the Rassegna di Studi Etiopici, together with both his own and Tancredi's transcriptions.

Physical description
The Ṣǝḥuf ʾǝmni inscription is found on a stone block measuring 1,80 x 1,60 m. The stone has been damaged and eleven lines of writing are preserved.

Language
The language of the Ṣǝḥuf ʾǝmni inscription remains unidentified. It is "neither Geʽez nor South Arabian, and does not resemble any known language from the region."

Sources

References

 
 

Undeciphered writing systems